Hockey India League (HIL), known as the Coal India Hockey India League is a professional field hockey league in India. The league is organized by Hockey India, the governing body for the sport in India. HIL, along with the Indian Premier League, Indian Super League, and Pro Kabaddi League, is considered one of the major sports leagues in the country. HIL consists of six teams, with the regular season lasting two months from January to February, with each team playing 10 games. The top four teams at the end of the season move into the play-offs, where the championship game decides the Hockey India League winner.

Hockey India League was founded in 2013 as part of Hockey India's attempt to get an International Hockey Federation sanctioned league after the un-sanctioned and non-Hockey India tournament, World Series Hockey, began in 2012. The first season took place in 2013 with five teams. Since beginning, the league has proven to be a financial success for Hockey India, who were in financial disarray before the league began. In 2015, it was reported that the federation earned a profit from the league and television revenues.

The most recent champion of the Hockey India League is Kalinga Lancers, who won the tournament in 2017. Ranchi Rhinos, Delhi Waveriders, Ranchi Rays and Punjab Warriors have also won the league.

History
In 2012, the Indian Hockey Federation and Nimbus began World Series Hockey, a professional field hockey league in India. After the success of the league, Hockey India announced the formation of their own franchise-based league, launched in mid-2012, known as the Hockey India League. Inspired by the cricket league, Indian Premier League, the league was approved by the International Hockey Federation. The league was originally planned to have six teams, which would be established after the bidding was done for the twelve proposed cities that would host an HIL team. However, due to lack of interest in a sixth city, the league commenced in 2013 with five teams: Delhi Waveriders, Mumbai Magicians, Punjab Warriors, Ranchi Rhinos, and Uttar Pradesh Wizards. Before the beginning of the season, ESPN STAR Sports was announced as the league's official broadcasting partner on a five-year deal.

The first match was played on 14 January 2013, as Delhi Waveriders defeated the Punjab Warriors 2–1 at the Dhyan Chand National Stadium. The league had gained some buzz from the marquee signings of India internationals Sardara Singh and Sandeep Singh, as well as the signings of foreign players such as Jamie Dwyer, Moritz Fürste, and Teun de Nooijer. The inaugural season ended with Ranchi Rhinos being the first champions, defeating the Delhi Waveriders 2–1 in the final. The league was considered a success immediately in the years following the inaugural season.

Before the beginning of the second season, the Kalinga Lancers were announced as the sixth team in the Hockey India League. However, after the 2014 season, the league suffered its first setback when the Mumbai Magicians disbanded. The team was swiftly replaced though with Dabang Mumbai being launched before the 2015 season. The league though suffered another setback before the 2015 season when Ranchi Rhinos, the inaugural champions, were disbanded after an ownership problem. The team though, like with Mumbai, was quickly replaced with Ranchi Rays.

Hockey India postponed the event in 2018 for unclear reasons. Later they announced that the next season of Hockey India league will be scheduled in November - December 2019.

Rules
If there is a tie in any match then there would be extra time. Still, if winner is not decided, there would be a shoot-out. If still the winner is not decided there would be no option left other than penalty strokes.

Teams

League championships

Tournament records

Sponsorship

Prize money
It was announced that the winning and losing team in the final is awarded 3 crores INR and 1.5 crores INR respectively.

Board
Before the league's first season, Hockey India appointed Steve Catton as competitions director.  Minister of State for Parliamentary Affairs Rajeev Shukla, leader of the opposition in Rajya Sabha, Arun Jaitley, and media personality Rajat Sharma are the members of the board for the Hockey India League. Along with Steve Catton, Barry Anderson was appointed as the tournament director.

Hockey India appointed Todd Faulds as its competitions director for the second edition of the Hockey India League. Todd worked as a competitions manager for the FIH 2012 Men's Champions Trophy in Melbourne and 2012 International Super Series in Perth.

Bjorn Isberg has been the Hockey India League tournament director since 2014. Isberg had served as tournament director for the 2012 London Olympics field hockey tournament, and three Champions Trophy tournaments (in 2004, 2007, and 2011).

See also
 Sports in India
 Field hockey in India
 World Series Hockey
 Premier Hockey League

References

External links

 
1
Professional sports leagues in India
Sports leagues established in 2013
2013 establishments in India
Sport in India